Jou is a parish of the municipality of Murça, Vila Real District, in northeast Portugal. The population in 2011 was 654, in an area of 37.29 km2.

References

Freguesias of Murça